The Walt Disney World Swan and Dolphin Resort consists of three hotels:

 Walt Disney World Dolphin
 Walt Disney World Swan
 Walt Disney World Swan Reserve